Aleksandar Jovanović (born 30 September 1966), commonly known by his nickname Ćuta, is a Serbian environmental activist and politician who has been a member of the National Assembly of Serbia since August 2022.

Born in Belgrade, Ćuta often stayed at Stara Planina, a mountain in Eastern Serbia, and was interested in rock music, football, and chess during his youth. He founded the "Defend the Rivers of Stara Planina" organisation in 2017, which primarily concentrated on combating the construction of small hydros in the Stara Planina region, although over time, Ćuta shifted his presence over other regions of Serbia. He gained recognition in the media and has been noted as one of the representatives of environmental activism in Serbia. Ćuta has organised protests and gatherings around Serbia and managed to stop the construction of several projects.

In 2021 Ćuta organised the Ecological Uprising protests, which set off the beginning of the 2021–2022 environmental protests, in which he played a key role. He later formed a movement, and a coalition with opposition politicians Nebojša Zelenović and Dobrica Veselinović, which was formalised in January 2022 under the name We Must. Ćuta appeared first on the We Must ballot list in the 2022 Serbian parliamentary election, after which he became a member in the National Assembly.

Early life 
Aleksandar Jovanović was born on 30 September 1966 in Belgrade, PR Serbia, FPR Yugoslavia. He grew up in the Žarkovo neighbourhood of Belgrade, and attended a primary school in Košutnjak and Banovo Brdo. He later attended the Faculty of Dramatic Arts at the University of Arts in Belgrade.

During his youth, Ćuta often stayed at Stara Planina, where his grandparents lived. He also showed his interest in rock music during his youth, when he learned to play the guitar. He often played football and chess. Jovanović is often known and referred by his nickname Ćuta.

Career

2016–2020 

His activist career began in 2016, and a year later, he founded the organisation Defend the Rivers of Stara Planina, to combat the construction of small hydroelectric power plants in the Stara Planina region. Since then, he has been a notable representative of the group of activists that opposes the construction of small hydros. Over the course of his activist career, he managed to stop the construction of several small hydros across Serbia.

In early 2018, Ćuta and other members of the his organisation formed a Facebook group, which quickly gained popularity. Due to his activism, in June 2018, the government of Serbia decided to send a thank-you note to Ćuta, although he ended up refusing to receive the note. He has criticised the Serbian government for its approach to environmental protection. In September 2018, he organised mass protests in Pirot; the protests were participated by a couple of thousand demonstrators, with a demand to prohibit the construction of small hydros. He and his organisation managed to send a case regarding the construction of a small hydro on the Visočica river to the Supreme Court of Cassation, which ended up prohibiting the construction of a small hydro in November 2018.

Over the course of 2019, he organised environmental protests across cities in Serbia, initially beginning in January. Another series of protests were held in April. A month later, he and other activists from his organisation were fined by the Misdemeanor Court after they cleaned the riverbed of the river in Rakita, and later that month they organised protests in front of the UniCredit headquarters in Belgrade. Two months later, they called for the government to react regarding the small hydro in Rakita. Ćuta organised protests in Belgrade on 21 September, and a week later, environmental activists held talks with Serbian president Aleksandar Vučić, during which he demanded for the total prohibition of constructing small hydros across Serbia; Vučić rejected his demand. He took part in The Weight of Chains 3 documentary film.

Ćuta called for protests to be held in June 2020, after accusing the government of not respecting environmental protection regulations. Activists, politicians, and scientists participated in the protests. He gave a speech during the protests and announced the removal of pipes from the bed of the Rakita river. In August, the government decided to invoke a ban of constructing small hydros in the Stara Planina region, and during mid-August, a group of citizens, led by him, managed to break two pipes, which disabled the pipeline in the river. The event gained national media coverage. Later that month, another protest was organised by Ćuta and Savo Manojlović, the general director of Kreni-Promeni. In November, Ćuta and other activists requested a talk to be held between them and the Anglo-Australian multinational company Rio Tinto, to discuss about the Project Jadar, although the talk ended up being cancelled.

2021–2022 
Protests which were dubbed as "Protests for Harmless Air", were organised in early January 2021. Ćuta, as a representative of his Defend the Rivers of Stara Planina organisation, participated in the protests and gave a speech criticising Rio Tinto and Linglong Tire, a Chinese tire manufacturing enterprise. During the protest, he stated that "air, water, and our country are non-negotiable". He was invited to the Utisak nedelje, a Serbian political talk show, on 7 March, where he expressed his pro-conservation views, and stated that "environmental activists in Serbia are labelled as enemies of the state". Two days after the show, he was detained by the police, and was released shortly after. Later that month, he said that he would organise an Ecological Uprising protest on 10 April. The request gained attention, and around 60 environmental organisations participated in the protests. Thousands of demonstrators gathered in front of the House of the National Assembly, and Jovanović demanded the government to suspend all projects harmful to the environment, as well as to adapt regulations to the highest environmental standards. Following the April protests, which he deemed to be successful, he stated that he would form an environmental movement, and that it would cooperate with other green movements in Serbia. During May, he and other environmental activists organised gatherings and protests at the Reva bog, which is located next to Krnjača. In June, he confirmed his ambition to form a movement, and stated that he would be ready to cooperate with a fellow opposition politician Nebojša Zelenović and the Do not let Belgrade drown (NDB) movement.

In August 2021, Ćuta and his newly formed Ecological uprising organisation announced that a protest would be held on 11 September. That protest marked the beginning of the 2021–2022 environmental protests, which were held until February 2022. He played a key role in the protests. During the protests, he received criticism from government officials, while the pro-government media spread attacked his career and views. His demands were mainly centred around Rio Tinto. In November, he called for the radicalisation of the protests, which led to roadblocks being organised across Serbia in late November and early December. During that period, he signed a coalition agreement with Zelenović's Together for Serbia (ZZS) party, and announced his participation in the 2022 general election. The coalition was formalised in January 2022, under the name We Must. Ćuta appeared first on the We Must ballot list. The coalition won around 5% of the popular vote and 13 seats in the National Assembly; he won his seat and became a MP.

In May, he announced the merger of Action, led by Zelenović, Ecological Uprising, and Assembly of Free Serbia into a joint political party, which occurred on 11 June. Together with Biljana Stojković and Zelenović, he became one of the co-leaders of the party. During the constitutive session of the National Assembly was held on 1 August, he announced that he would head the committee for environmentalism, although he ended up being assigned as a member of the committee.

Personal life 
He resides in Belgrade. Ćuta has been married twice, and has two children. The Party of Freedom and Justice (SSP) political party criticised Jovanović in 2021 due to the alleged claim that he participated in the foundation of the Serbian Progressive Party (SNS), something that he had denied doing. During an interview for Vreme, Ćuta stated that he "was offered to create a green party that would cooperate with SNS", although he rejected the offer.

References

External links 

1966 births
Living people
Serbian activists
Environmentalism in Europe
21st-century Serbian politicians
Serbian rock musicians
European environmentalists
Politicians from Belgrade
Members of the National Assembly (Serbia)
Ecological Uprising politicians
Together (Serbia) politicians